Heiner Hoffmann (29 April 1915 – 27 April 1945) was a German cyclist. He competed in the team pursuit event at the 1936 Summer Olympics. He was killed in action during World War II.

References

External links
 

1915 births
1945 deaths
German male cyclists
Olympic cyclists of Germany
Cyclists at the 1936 Summer Olympics
Cyclists from Hesse
German military personnel killed in World War II
Sportspeople from Hanau
20th-century German people